Jasroslav Masrna (born 5 August 1950) is a former Slovak football player, who played for FC Spartak Trnava.

External links
Profile at Czech football federation

1950 births
Living people
Slovak footballers
FC Spartak Trnava players
Czechoslovak footballers
Czechoslovakia international footballers

Association footballers not categorized by position